Poggioferro is a village in Tuscany, central Italy,  administratively a frazione of the comune of Scansano, province of Grosseto. At the time of the 2001 census its population amounted to 205.

Poggioferro is about 32 km from Grosseto and 6 km from Scansano, and it is situated on the hills along the Amiatina Provincial Road.

Main sights 
 Santa Croce, main parish church of the village, it was built in 18th century and renovated in 1933.

References

Bibliography 
 Aldo Mazzolai, Guida della Maremma. Percorsi tra arte e natura, Le Lettere, Florence, 1997.
 Giuseppe Guerrini, Torri e castelli della Provincia di Grosseto, Nuova Immagine Editrice, Siena, 1999.

See also 
 Baccinello
 Montorgiali
 Murci
 Pancole, Scansano
 Polveraia
 Pomonte, Scansano
 Preselle

Frazioni of Scansano